A Game of Thrones: The Card Game Second Edition (or AGoT, for short) is a Living Card Game (LCG) produced by Fantasy Flight Games. It is based on A Song of Ice and Fire,  a series of novels written by George R. R. Martin.  The second edition of this LCG, it is not backwards compatible with the first edition that preceded it.

In the game, players assume the leadership of one of the great houses of Westeros vying for control of King's Landing and the Iron Throne. To accomplish this, players launch military attacks against their opponents, undermine their opponents’ plans with intrigues of their own, and make power plays to win the support of the realm.

Reception
The game was praised that its "presentation is very strong [...] while the presence of a separate reference book makes the main rule book manageable for new players [...] The text on some cards could be clearer, such as when a card may be played on a character controlled by an opponent" Other reviews criticized two-player options noting that it "is at its best with four" yet others praised that "the game really shines is in its attention to the flavor, theme, and atmosphere of the stories that inspired it—not just in terms of its lavish artwork, but in the way it captures the essence of the series in its core mechanics." The game's Core Set was nominated for the 2015 Golden Geek as both Best Card Game and Best 2-Player Board Game.

Rules
The game is played in a phases with each player interacting during a phase. From the official rules:
A Game of Thrones: The Card Game can be played by two or more players. A two-player game uses the joust format, while a game with three or more players uses the melee format.
In the game, each player plays as one of eight great factions vying to influence and control the Iron Throne and gain power in Westeros. Each player controls two decks: a draw deck that provides the forces a player’s faction has at its command each round, and a special plot deck that is used to develop and manage a long term strategy.
Over the course of the game the players engage one another in military, intrigue, and political conflicts, until a single player emerges victorious. The first player  to amass 15 power wins the game.

Sets and expansions

References

External links
A Game of Thrones: Second Edition - Official website
 

Dedicated deck card games
Fantasy Flight Games games
Fantasy games
Games based on A Song of Ice and Fire